The 2012–13 CA Osasuna season was the 92nd season in the club's history.

Players and staff

Competitions

Liga BBVA

Legend

Matches

Kickoff times are in CET and CEST

14

17

20

23
24
25
26

33

36

Copa del Rey

Round of 32

Round of 16

Players and evens

Squad information

Transfers out

Squad

Starting 11
4–2–3–1 Formation

<div style="position: relative;">

Sources

External links

CA Osasuna
CA Osasuna seasons